This is a list of countries by iron ore production based on U.S. Geological Survey data.

List

Pig iron production
This is a list of countries by pig iron production.

See also 
 List of countries by steel production
 List of iron mines
 Iron-ore exports by country

Notes

References

Lists of countries by mineral production
Countries